Miss Europe 1953 was the 16th edition of the Miss Europe pageant and the fifth edition under the Mondial Events Organization. It was held in Istanbul, Turkey on September 9, 1953. Eloisa Cianni of Italy, was crowned Miss Europe 1953 by out going titleholder Günseli Başar of Turkey.

Results

Placements

Contestants 

 - Lore Felger
 - Sépia Degehet
 - Marlene Ann Dee
 - Maija-Riitta Tuomaala†
 - Sylviane Carpentier†
 - Marie-Louise Nagel
 - Antouanetta (Antouaneta) Rontopoulou
 - Yvonne de Meijer (Yvonne Meyer)
 - Eloisa Cianni
 - Elisabeth Chovisky
 - Marianna Törnqvist
 - Eliane Pade
 - Belgin Doruk†

Notes

Debuts

Withdrawals

References

External links 
 

Miss Europe
1953 beauty pageants
1953 in Turkey